The Women's 400m Individual Medley (IM) at the 2007 World Aquatics Championships took place on 1 April (prelims & finals) at the Rod Laver Arena in Melbourne, Australia. As the event was over 200 meters in length, no semifinals were held in it and the top 8 swimmers from the preliminary heats advance directly to the single final heat. 40 swimmers were entered in the event, of which 48 swam.

Existing records at the start of the event were:
World Record (WR):  4:33.59, Yana Klochkova (Ukraine), 16 September 2000 in Sydney, Australia
Championship Record (CR): 4:36.07, Katie Hoff (USA), Montreal 2005 (31 July 2005)

Results

Finals

Preliminaries

See also
 Swimming at the 2005 World Aquatics Championships – Women's 400 metre individual medley
 Swimming at the 2008 Summer Olympics – Women's 400 metre individual medley
 Swimming at the 2009 World Aquatics Championships – Women's 400 metre individual medley

References

Women's 400m IM Preliminary results from the 2007 World Championships. Published by OmegaTiming.com (official timer of the '07 Worlds); Retrieved 2009-07-11.
Women's 400m Medley Final results from the 2007 World Championships. Published by OmegaTiming.com (official timer of the '07 Worlds); Retrieved 2009-07-11.

Swimming at the 2007 World Aquatics Championships
2007 in women's swimming